William Cicero Hammer (March 24, 1865 – September 26, 1930) was a U.S. Representative from North Carolina.

Born near Asheboro, North Carolina, Hammer attended private and common schools.
He studied at Yadkin Institute and Western Maryland College, Westminster, Maryland.
He taught school and was principal of two academies.
He was graduated in law from the University of North Carolina at Chapel Hill in 1891.
He was admitted to the bar in September 1891 and commenced practice in Asheboro, North Carolina.
He served as mayor of Asheboro, member of the city council, school commissioner (1895–1899), and local Superintendent of public instruction (1891–1895 and again in 1899-1901).
He served as solicitor (district attorney) in the superior court 1901-1914.
For more than forty years, Hammer was owner and editor of the Asheboro Courier.
He was appointed United States attorney for the Western District of North Carolina on February 24, 1914, and served until September 20, 1920.

Hammer was elected as a Democrat to the Sixty-seventh and to the four succeeding Congresses and served from March 4, 1921, until his death in Asheboro, North Carolina, September 26, 1930.
He was interred in City Cemetery.

See also
List of United States Congress members who died in office (1900–49)

Sources

1865 births
1930 deaths
University of North Carolina School of Law alumni
Democratic Party members of the United States House of Representatives from North Carolina
United States Attorneys for the Western District of North Carolina
People from Asheboro, North Carolina